José Wellington Bezerra da Costa (born São Luís do Curu, 14 October 1934) is a Brazilian Pentecostal pastor from the Assemblies of God Bethlehem Ministry in Brazil. Since January 1980, he has been the General Superintendent of the Assembleias de Deus (AD)  the largest Latin American Pentecostal denomination, which is related to the Assembly of God. He also is a Pastor of the Assembly of God Bethlehem Ministry in São Paulo, Brazil. Today, the Assembly of God Bethlehem Ministry in Brazil exceeds 400,000 member and congregants.
He is a member of the world commission of the World Assemblies of God Fellowship.

References

External links
 Website
 Assembly of God Bethlehem Ministry in Brazil

1934 births
Living people
Brazilian Assemblies of God pastors
People from Ceará